The Doctors is a British television series, produced by the BBC between 1969 and 1971.

The series was set around a general practice in north London and leading cast members included: Justine Lord, Nigel Stock, Barry Justice, Richard Leech, Isla Blair and Lynda La Plante (billed as Lynda Marchal).

Nigel Stock's character, Dr. Thomas Owens, was the lead in a later spin-off series, Owen, M.D., which aired between 1971 and 1973.

Most of the episodes produced are missing from the archives; 139 of the 160 shows are thought to be lost..

External links

BBC television dramas
British medical television series
1969 British television series debuts
1971 British television series endings
1960s British drama television series
1970s British drama television series
Lost BBC episodes
English-language television shows